Xue Juzheng ( – 12 July 981; courtesy name Ziping) was a scholar-official who successively served the Later Jin, Later Han, Later Zhou and Song dynasties. He was one of the chief ministers of the Song dynasty from 973 until his death.

Xue is best known today for being the lead author of the monumental history book Old History of the Five Dynasties (974).

During the Five Dynasties
Born during the Later Liang, Xue Juzheng was said to be studious and ambitious from a young age. In 934 during the Later Tang Xue failed the imperial examination and wrote "An Essay to Dispel Sorrows", which was much praised. He passed the imperial examination the following year.

After the Later Jin destroyed the Later Tang in 937, Xue served on the staff of Liu Suining, the military governor of Hua Prefecture. In 941, he was recommended by Liu Suining's older cousin Liu Suiqing and became a patrolling inspector for the Salt Monopoly. In 944, he served as a judge in the Bureau of General Accounts. When Li Song became the director for the Salt Monopoly, Xue served on his staff. Xue also received a position in the Court of Judicial Review, and subsequently he was made a reminder official in the Secretariat. In 946, when Sang Weihan was made the prefect of Kaifeng, Xue joined him as an administrative assistant.

During the Later Han, Xue once saved a commoner from execution. The man was accused of violating salt laws, but Xue found the evidence unconvincing. After further questioning he discovered bad blood between the defendant and the accuser, a minor government functionary who eventually admitted to making false accusations.

After Later Zhou's founding in 951, Xue was made vice director of the Bureau of Review, also in charge of all judges in the State Finance Commission.

During the Song dynasty
When the Song Dynasty replaced the Later Zhou in 960, Xue took service with the new dynasty as he had with dynasties prior to the new rulers of northern China.  During the first two decades of the Song, Xue set about to compiling a history of the Five Dynasties.

Entitled Five Dynasties History, the main purpose of the work was to reinforce the claim of the Song to the Mandate of Heaven from the Tang Dynasty through the Five Dynasties to the reigning Song.

Death and legacy
Xue did not live much longer than after compilation of the Five Dynasties History in 974, dying in 981. However, his legacy of writing a history of a previous era of Chinese history for the purpose of bolstering the current patron dynasty would be repeated later in Chinese history, notably with the Yuan Dynasty’s writing of the History of Liao.

References

Citations

Sources 

 
 

910s births
981 deaths
Song dynasty historians
10th-century Chinese historians
Later Zhou politicians
Later Han (Five Dynasties) politicians
Later Jin (Five Dynasties) politicians
Song dynasty politicians from Henan
Song dynasty chancellors
Politicians from Kaifeng
Writers from Kaifeng
Historians from Henan